Georgios Manthatis (born 11 May 1997) is a Greek professional footballer who plays as a winger for Veikkausliiga club KTP, on loan from Kallithea.

Club career

Olympiacos
On 15 December 2016, Manthatis scored the only goal in a Greek Cup preliminary round match against Sparti. It was the first goal with the club in all competitions. On 18 December 2016, he made his debut in the Super League as a substitute, in a 3–1 home win against Panetolikos. On 21 January 2017, he scored, as a substitute, his first Super League goal in a 2–0 home win game against Xanthi sealing his club's victory.

Loans
On 31 August 2017, he was loaned to PAS Giannina for two years.

On 22 August 2018, he was loaned to another Super League club Panionios for one year.

On 25 July 2019, he was loaned to Cypriot First Division club Anorthosis for one year.

Panetolikos
On 23 December 2020, following his release from Olympiacos, he joined Panetolikos, until the summer of 2022. In his debut, he scored helping to a 2–1 home win against OFI.

Kallithea
On 7 January 2022, following his release from Panetolikos, he joined Kallithea, until the summer of 2022. In his debut, he scored helping to a 1–0 home win against Panathinaikos B.

International career 
On 15 March 2017, as an Olympiacos youngster Manthatis' international call in Greece national football team was a big surprise by Michael Skibbe for Greece's crucial qualifier next week against Belgium.

Career statistics

Club

Honours
Olympiacos
Superleague: 2016–17

References

External links

1997 births
Living people
Footballers from Sofia
Greek footballers
Greek expatriate footballers
Greece youth international footballers
Bulgarian footballers
Bulgarian people of Greek descent
Super League Greece players
Olympiacos F.C. players
PAS Giannina F.C. players
Panionios F.C. players
Association football midfielders